Lucas Watzenrode (also, in German, Lukas; in Polish, Łukasz; 1400, in Thorn, Ermland –1462, in Thorn) was the maternal grandfather of Nicolaus Copernicus.

Life
Lucas Watzenrode the Elder was registered in the Thorn citizen registry book (Thorner Bürgerbuch) as landowner, businessmen, judge, councilman, etc., living at Seglergasse in Thorn. In 1436 he married Katharina von Rüdiger. In 1448 he and other Thorn burghers are registered as having been summoned to the court at Limburg.

Lucas and his wife Katharina had a daughter, Barbara, who married Nicolas Kopernik. Katharina's sister Christina married Tideman von Allen. Both sisters married in Towun.

Lucas Watzenrode the Elder's grandson became known as Nicolaus Copernicus. Copernicus had an uncle, his mother's brother, also named Lucas Watzenrode (Lucas Watzenrode the Younger), who as Bishop of Ermland strongly supported the independence of Ermland and helped rear Nicolaus and his brother Andreas after their father's death.

Christina and Tideman's daughter Cordula von Allen married Reinhold Feldstedt, who was born 1468 in Danzig and died 1529 in Danzig. Their daughter Katharina Feldstedt married Herman Giese, born 1523 in Danzig. A descendant was Tideman Giese, a famous bishop of Ermland.

Lucas Watzenrode the Younger
Copernicus' uncle and patron Lucas Watzenrode the Younger followed as bishop of Ermland when Bishop Nicolaus Tungen died in 1489. Bishops were also secular rulers of Ermland. Lucas Watzenrode the Younger had been elected, but Casimir IV, King of Poland, etc., did not wish him to be bishop; the King wanted his son Friedrich to become bishop, in order to invalidate the Teutonic Knights' government and to be able to force Prussia to unite with Poland. Watzenrode, however, was ordained by the pope as bishop and ruler of Ermland, a part of Prussia but then an exempt bishopric. The Prussian nobility, Teutonic Knights, and part of the Polish clergy supported Watzenrode the Younger. Poland's King Casimir IV did continue attempts at conquest and in 1492 planned to remove Watzenrode by military force. His death foiled this plan. Watzenrode the Younger now was able to have cordial neighborly working relations with the sons of Casimir IV, Jan I Olbracht, then Aleksander Jagiellończyk, then Zygmunt I the Old. At times he was adviser to them. He also had  good working relations with the Teutonic Knights but, when necessary, upheld the independent status of Ermland.

Lucas Watzenrode the Younger founded a cathedral school in Frauenburg and planned to open a university in Elbing. He had a large library and was instrumental in having the first literary books printed for the Ermland bishopric. He donated many paintings and sculptures, altars, etc.

Lucas Watzenrode the Younger's nephew Nicolaus Copernicus and the latter's brother Andreas Kopernik were reared by their Bishop uncle from the death of their father in 1483. Copernicus aided Watzenrode from 1503 to 1510 and received a canonate. Having the accompanying income, in turn, was of great assistance to Copernicus in his astronomical studies and enabled him to dispense free medical help to the poor inhabitants of Ermland.

See also
 Bishops of Warmia
 Nicolaus Copernicus

References
 Library Danzig, J. Kretzmer, Liber de episcopatu et episcopi Varmiensis ex vetusto Chronico Bibliotheca Heilsbergensis, 1593.
 Christoph Hartknoch, Preussische Kirchen-Historia, Frankfurt am Main, 1668.
 M.G. Centner, Geehrte und Gelehrte Thorner, Thorn, 1763.
 A. Semrau, "Katalog der Geschlechter der Schöffenbank und des Ratsstuhles in der Altstadt Thorn 1233-1602", in: Mitteilungen des Copernicus-Vereins für Wissenschaft und Kunst zu Thorn 46, 1938.
 Wojciech Iwanczak, "Lucas Watzenrode", in Biographisch-Bibliographisches Kirchenlexikon, Bautz Verlag .
 Poczet biskupów warmińskich, Olsztyn, 1998.

pl:Łukasz Watzenrode

1400 births
1462 deaths
Nicolaus Copernicus